In the Standard Model, using quantum field theory it is conventional to use the helicity basis to simplify calculations (of cross sections, for example).  In this basis, the spin is quantized along the axis in the direction of motion of the particle.

Spinors
The two-component helicity eigenstates  satisfy

where
 are the Pauli matrices,
 is the direction of the fermion momentum,

To say more about the state,  we will use the generic form of fermion four-momentum:

Then one can say the two helicity eigenstates are

and

These can be simplified by defining the z-axis such that the momentum direction is either parallel or anti-parallel, or rather:
.

In this situation the helicity eigenstates are for when the particle momentum is 
 and 

then for when momentum is 
 and

Fermion (spin 1/2) wavefunction
A fermion 4-component wave function,  may be decomposed into states with definite four-momentum:

where

Put it more explicitly, the Dirac spinors in the helicity basis for a fermion is

and for an anti-fermion,

Dirac matrices
To use these helicity states, one can use the Weyl (chiral) representation for the Dirac matrices.

Spin-1 wavefunctions
The plane wave expansion is
.

For a vector boson with mass m and a four-momentum , the polarization vectors quantized with respect to its momentum direction can be defined as

where
 is transverse momentum, and
 is the energy of the boson.

Standard Model